The 2020–21 Euroleague Basketball Next Generation Tournament, also called Adidas Next Generation Tournament by sponsorship reasons, is the 19th edition of the international junior basketball tournament organized by Euroleague Basketball.

Teams
In this edition, the number of the participating under-18 teams was reduced to 24. They will play in three qualifying tournaments between December 2020 and February 2021. CFBB Paris was supposed to participate, but was replaced by Tofaş Bursa.

Qualifying tournaments

Valencia, Spain

27–29 December 2020

The first qualifying tournament featured hosts Valencia Basket, 2015–2016 champions Barcelona, Herbalife Gran Canaria, Unicaja, Joventut, all from Spain,
LDLC ASVEL and Nanterre 92 from France, and ratiopharm Ulm from Germany. Barcelona defeated Joventut 79–55 in the final and advanced to the final tournament.

Group A

Group B

7th place game

5th place game

3rd place game

Final

Final ranking

Istanbul, Turkey

19–21 March 2021
The second qualifying tournament featured hosts Fenerbahçe Beko and Anadolu Efes, as well as Tofaş Bursa, all from Turkey, the 2018–19 champions Real Madrid and Casademont Zaragoza from Spain, Stella Azzurra from Italy, Žalgiris from Lithuania and Basket Brno from Czech Republic. Real Madrid won 85–77 against Stella Azzurra to advance to the final tournament.

Group A

Group B

7th place game

5th place game

3rd place game

Final

Final ranking

Belgrade, Serbia

26–28 March 2021
The third qualifying tournament featured hosts Crvena zvezda mts, Partizan NIS and Mega Soccerbet, as well as Budućnost VOLI Podgorica from Montenegro, Cedevita Olimpija from Slovenia, Lokomotiv Kuban from Russia, Maccabi Tel Aviv from Israel and U-BT Cluj-Napoca from Romania. Mega Soccerbet won 82–80 against Crvena zvezda mts to advance to the final tournament.

Group A

Group B

7th place game

5th place game

3rd place game

Final

Final ranking

Final tournament

The Final tournament was played between 3 and 6 June 2021 in Valencia, Spain.

Teams

Group A

Group B

Final

Awards
MVP

 Eli Ndiaye (Real Madrid)

All-Tournament Team

 Kymany Houinsou (LDLC ASVEL)
 Nikola Đurišić (Mega Soccerbet)
 James Nnaji (Barcelona)
 Michael Caicedo (Barcelona)
 Eli Ndiaye (Real Madrid)

References

External links
Official website

Euroleague Basketball Next Generation Tournament
Next Generation Tournament